The John Carson House, at 205 S. Main St. in Morgantown, Kentucky, is a historic Queen Anne-style house built in 1890.  It was listed on the National Register of Historic Places in 1991.

It is a two-and-a-half-story house.

A second contributing building on the property is a one-story frame building which originally served as servants quarters.

References

National Register of Historic Places in Butler County, Kentucky
Queen Anne architecture in Kentucky
Houses completed in 1890
1890 establishments in Kentucky
Morgantown, Kentucky